The 1982–83 Ohio State Buckeyes men's basketball team represented Ohio State University during the 1982–83 NCAA Division I men's basketball season. Led by 7th-year head coach Eldon Miller, the Buckeyes finished 20–10 (11–7 Big Ten) and reached the Sweet Sixteen of the NCAA tournament.

Roster

Schedule/results

|-
!colspan=9 style=| Non-Conference Regular season

|-
!colspan=9 style=| Big Ten Regular season

|-
!colspan=9 style=|NCAA Tournament

Rankings

References

Ohio State Buckeyes men's basketball seasons
Ohio State
Ohio State